Noah Rubin was the defending champion, but chose not to participate this year.

Unseeded American Reilly Opelka won the title, defeating Swede Mikael Ymer 7–6(7–5), 6–4 in the final.

Seeds

Main draw

Finals

Top half

Section 1

Section 2

Bottom half

Section 3

Section 4

External links

Boys' Singles
Wimbledon Championship by year – Boys' singles